Haplolabida lacrimans is a species of moth of the family Geometridae first described by Claude Herbulot in 1970. It is found in northern Madagascar.

This species looks close to Haplolabida marojejensis, described by Herbulot in 1963.

References

Larentiinae
Moths described in 1970
Moths of Madagascar
Moths of Africa